Jean-Louis Bernard (31 March 1938 – 25 March 2020) was a member of the National Assembly of France. and represented the Loiret department.  He was born in Saulieu, Côte-d'Or, and was a member of the Radical Party and worked in association with the Union for a Popular Movement. He was the mayor of Orléans from 1988 to 1989.

References

1938 births
2020 deaths
People from Saulieu
Radical Party (France) politicians
Mayors of Orléans
Union for a Popular Movement politicians
Deputies of the 12th National Assembly of the French Fifth Republic
Deputies of the 13th National Assembly of the French Fifth Republic
Politicians from Centre-Val de Loire
French surgeons